A protagonist is the leading actor or the principal character in a story whose fate is most closely followed by the reader or audience.

Protagonist may also refer to:

 Protagonist (film), a 2007 documentary written and directed by Jessica Yu
 Protagonist (Persona 3), a player-named character in the video game Persona 3
 Der Protagonist, a 1926 opera by Kurt Weill with libretto by Georg Kaiser
 The Protagonists (1968 film), an Italian film directed by Marcello Fondato
 The Protagonists (1999 film), an Italian film directed by Luca Guadagnino
 The Protagonist, the alias of the otherwise nameless main character in Tenet (film)

See also

Protagonistas, a Spanish language reality television franchise

Agonist (disambiguation)
Antagonist (disambiguation)